Vegetarian and vegan festivals are held around the world to promote veganism and/or vegetarianism among the public and to support and link individuals and organizations that practice, promote or endorse veganism or vegetarianism. Many of these events are also food festivals and/or music festivals and can also contain edutainment.

List 
This is a list of notable vegetarian or vegan festivals.

International 

Some vegetarian and vegan festivals are held in multiple countries at multiple times a year. These include:
 Veganmania
 VeggieWorld
 Veggie Pride
In addition to these, many vegetarian or vegan festivals may call themselves 'VegFest', but these do not appear to have any international ties to each other.

Austria 
In Austria, Veganmania festivals are held in:
Graz
Innsbruck
Vienna (twice a year). The 2014 Vienna edition built the biggest vegan fried egg in the world.

Canada 
 Toronto, Ontario. The Toronto Vegetarian Food Fair has been held in Toronto at the Harbourfront since 1985. Around 2005 it attracted 15,000 to 20,000 visitors a year.

Croatia 
In Croatia, Veganmania festivals are held in:
 Zagreb. Officially known as the ZeGeVege Festival, held annually since 2008, organised by Prijatelji životinja ('Animal Friends').

Czech Republic 
 Fluff Fest is an independent hardcore punk festival held each July in Rokycany, Czech Republic. It is fully vegan, with catering provided by local animal rights organization Svoboda zvířat.
 Obscene Extreme annual extreme metal music festival that offers exclusively vegetarian and vegan food within its premises since 1999.

France 

In France, VeggieWorld festivals are held in:
Lyon. 3rd edition held in 2019.
Paris. VeggieWorld Paris 2019 was the 7th Parisian edition and attracted over 8,000 visitors, which was 14% more than the 6th.

Germany 
In Germany, Veganmania festivals are held in:
Iserlohn
Regensburg. The first edition in 2014 attracted over 5,000 visitors.
Würzburg

VeggieWorld festivals are held in:
Berlin. VeggieWorld Berlin was first held in 2015 with 55 stands, which grew to 130 stands in 2019. The 2019 edition saw 10,000 visitors.
Düsseldorf. The 5th edition was held in 2019.
Wiesbaden (2011–2020). 10 editions of VeggieWorld have been held in Wiesbaden from 2011 to 2020, with the last attracting 13,000 visitors. The next edition is scheduled to take place in 2021 in Frankfurt.

Other festivals:
 The Vegan Summerfest (German: Veganes Sommerfest) is a three-day vegan food festival that takes place on the Alexanderplatz in Berlin, co-organised by ProVeg International, Berlin Vegan and the Albert Schweitzer Foundation. The 2019 edition featured around 100 information and selling stands.

India
 Aranmula Vallasadya

Netherlands 

The following festivals in the Netherlands are focused on vegetarian and vegan food, community and activism:
 VeggieWorld in Utrecht, since 2016, vegan. The 2020 edition attracted 9,000 visitors.
 VegFest in Utrecht, since 2014, vegan

Poland 

In Poland, the Otwarte Klatki ('Open Cages') association organises Veganmania festivals in several different cities. Veganmania in Poland has been held in eight major cities, with the 2019 Łódź edition attracting over 3,000 visitors.

Switzerland 

In Switzerland, Veganmania festivals are held in:
Aarau. Veganmania in Switzerland has been organised by Swissveg since 2011. The 2016 edition attracted 5,000 visitors, making it the largest of all vegan festivals in Switzerland. Previous editions were held in Winterthur, but due to a lack of space to accommodate the attendees, the organisation chose to move the festival to Aarau.
Gossau, St. Gallen. The Gossau Veganmania, organised by Swissveg, was held first in 2017, then featuring 60 stands.

Thailand 
see Nine Emperor Gods Festival

United Kingdom 

VegfestUK is an annual vegan food festival held each year in various cities, starting in 2013.

United States 

Boston, Massachusetts. The Boston Vegetarian Food Festival (BVFF) is held annually in the autumn, at the Reggie Lewis Track and Athletic Center in Mission Hill, Boston, between mid-October and early November.

See also 

 American Vegan Society - publishes online list of vegan-oriented VegFests in USA and Canada
 Animal rights
 Buddhist cuisine
 Buddhist vegetarianism
 Korean temple cuisine
 List of food days
 List of vegetarian and vegan companies
 List of vegetarian organizations
 Meat-free days
 Veganism
 Vegetarian week
 Vegetarianism by country
 World Vegan Day
 World Vegetarian Day

References

Vegetarianism
Veganism
and
 Vege